Shahrak-e Emam Sadeq (also Romanized as Shahrak-e Emām Şādeq) is a village in Bakhtegan Rural District, Abadeh Tashk District, Neyriz County, Fars Province, Iran. At the 2006 census, its population was 438, in 108 families.

References 

Populated places in Abadeh Tashk County